Kaitou Sentai Lupinranger VS Keisatsu Sentai Patranger is a 2018 Japanese television series, and is the 42nd entry of the long-running Super Sentai series produced by Toei Company and TV Asahi. The series features two teams of heroes: The Lupinrangers, a band of gentleman thieves, and the Patrangers, a police task force. Each with their own reasons, the two groups compete against each other to retrieve the Lupin Collection, a set of mysterious and powerful artifacts which were stolen by the Interdimensional Crime Group Gangler.

Episodes

References

Kaitou Sentai Lupinranger VS Keisatsu Sentai Patranger